Jorge Martínez Reverte (28 September 1948 – 24 March 2021) was a Spanish writer, journalist, and historian.

References

1948 births
2021 deaths
Spanish writers